John Hammond (January 1842 – 17 November 1907) was a UK Member of Parliament (MP) representing Carlow County in Ireland, from 1891 to 1907. A prominent merchant from Tullow Street in the town of Carlow, he was first elected to parliament as an Anti-Parnellite Irish National Federation candidate in the 1891 by-election. In 1899 he became the first Chairman of Carlow County Council and held that position until his death. Highly regarded for his probity and integrity, he enjoyed strong support from the Roman Catholic bishop and clergy. He was a Justice of the Peace and in his younger days he was actively involved with the Land League.

References

External links 
 

1907 deaths
UK MPs 1886–1892
UK MPs 1892–1895
UK MPs 1895–1900
UK MPs 1900–1906
UK MPs 1906–1910
Members of the Parliament of the United Kingdom for County Carlow constituencies (1801–1922)
Anti-Parnellite MPs
1842 births
Healyite Nationalist MPs